A particularly dangerous situation (PDS) tag is enhanced wording first used by the Storm Prediction Center (SPC), a national guidance center of the United States National Weather Service, for tornado watches and eventually expanded to use for other severe weather watches and warnings by local NWS forecast offices. It is issued at the discretion of the forecaster composing the watch or warning and implies that there is an enhanced risk of very severe and life-threatening weather, usually a major tornado outbreak or a long-lived, extreme derecho event, but possibly another weather hazard such as an exceptional flash flood or wildfire.

PDS watches are quite uncommon; less than 3% of watches issued by the SPC from 1996 to 2005 were PDS watches, or an average of 24 each year. When a PDS watch is issued, there are often more PDS watches issued for the same weather system, even on the same day during major outbreaks, so the number of days per year that a PDS watch is issued is significantly lower.

Background
The short history of the origin of the option of issuing a tornado watch with the enhanced PDS wording occurred during the winter of 1981–82 when the Severe Local Storms (SELS) unit transitioned to a more flexible method of issuing weather products. Ed Ferguson, Deputy Director of the National Severe Storms Forecast Center (NSSFC), suggested to Lead Forecaster Jack Hales that the guidance center could provide an opportunity to give more resolution to the tornado watch product. Hales suggested the PDS option to identify areas where, a few times each year, conditions are most likely to aid in the development of large and intense tornadoes. The first PDS tornado watch was issued by Robert H. Johns for the April 2, 1982 tornado outbreak across the southern and central Great Plains.

While historically applied only to severe thunderstorm, tornado and flash flood watches (i.e., severe local storm "polygonal" events), PDS wording could theoretically be applied to other types of weather watches (such as winter storm, high wind, hurricane, or fire weather watches) when an enhanced threat for such conditions exists. These watches have generally (but not always) been issued during a high risk or an upper-end moderate risk either of severe storms from the SPC's convective outlooks or of flash flooding from the Weather Prediction Center (WPC)'s excessive rainfall outlooks.

On April 24, 2011, the National Weather Service Weather Forecast Office in Memphis, Tennessee, issued the first PDS flash flood watch to highlight the threat for widespread, significant and potentially life-threatening flash flooding due to repeated rounds of severe thunderstorms.

On December 19, 2017, and August 3, 2018, the National Weather Service Weather Forecast Office in Reno, Nevada, issued PDS red flag warnings to highlight the threat for potentially life-threatening fire danger due to strong gusty winds and low humidity.

Issuance

PDS flash flood watch 
PDS flash flood watches are issued when there is a higher-than-normal risk of widespread, life-threatening flash flooding. These watches are issued by local NWS Weather Forecast Offices, not the Storm Prediction Center.

Below is the first PDS flash flood watch, which was issued by the National Weather Service Forecast Office in Memphis, Tennessee, on April 24, 2011, as mentioned above.

PDS flash flood warning 
PDS flash flood warnings are issued when there is a higher than normal risk of widespread, life-threatening flash flooding. Like PDS flash flood watches, they are issued by the local NWS Weather Forecast Offices, rather than the Storm Prediction Center. Recently, they have been issued as PDS flash flood emergencies, most notably by the National Weather Service offices in Houston and Corpus Christi, Texas.

This warning was issued in the morning of May 30, 2018, by the National Weather Service Forecast Office in Greenville–Spartanburg, South Carolina, while Subtropical Storm Alberto was affecting the area. It was also issued on September 1, 2021, by the National Weather Service Forecast Office in New York, New York while the remnants of Hurricane Ida affected the region.  It also contains the flash flood emergency phrase, which further underscores the risk of life-threatening flash flooding.

PDS high wind warning 

PDS high wind warnings are issued by the National Weather Service when non-convective winds are expected to be especially damaging or dangerous to people and property, beyond what would be expected of a typical high wind warning.

The warning below was issued by the National Weather Service in Salt Lake City, Utah, on September 8, 2020, for an extreme downslope wind event in Salt Lake City and the northern Wasatch Front.

PDS red flag warning 
PDS red flag warnings are issued by the National Weather Service to inform the public that there is an unusually high threat of wildland fire combustion, and rapid spread of wildfires, due to very dry fuels, very low humidity levels, and strong winds.

The PDS red flag warning below was issued by the National Weather Service in Reno, Nevada, on December 19, 2017.

On August 3, 2018, the National Weather Service in Reno, Nevada, issued another PDS red flag warning to communicate the threat of life-threatening fire danger due to strong gusty winds and low humidity.

On April 12, 2022, the National Weather Service in Norman, Oklahoma, issued a PDS red flag warning because of an extreme fire weather behavior (overlap of extremely dry fuels, humidity as low as 8 percent and wind gusting to 60 mph).

PDS severe thunderstorm watch 
PDS severe thunderstorm watches are issued when there is a higher than normal risk of severe thunderstorm winds capable of major structural damage (in addition to large hail and perhaps a few isolated tornadoes), usually due to a strong and persistent derecho. These watches are very rare (accounting an average of only two each year), as the risk for tornadoes must remain low enough to not warrant a tornado watch (a normal tornado watch would be issued if the tornado risk is significant alongside the extreme wind threat).

This PDS severe thunderstorm watch shown below was issued by the Storm Prediction Center in Norman, Oklahoma, on May 12, 2022, for an derecho in portions of Iowa, Minnesota, Nebraska, and South Dakota.

PDS special marine warning 
PDS Special marine warnings are issued by the National Weather Service to inform mariners of weather conditions that present a considerable threat to life and property.

On April 19, 2018, the Baltimore/Washington, D.C. forecast office upgraded a special marine warning to PDS status as a gust front approached Chesapeake Bay.

PDS special weather statement 
PDS special weather statements are usually issued by the NWS for hazards that do not have a specific code of their own, and pose an exceptionally high risk of damage and loss of life.

The PDS special weather statement below was issued by the National Weather Service in Buffalo, New York, on December 11, 2013, regarding extreme amounts of lake effect snow to impact the defined area. The same office issued multiple PDS Special Weather Statements for hurricane-force winds forecast to hit the Buffalo area on February 24, 2019.

PDS tornado watch 
PDS tornado watches are issued when there is a higher than normal risk of multiple strong to violent tornadoes – especially those that are predicted to be long-track in nature, with path lengths of more than 20 miles – in the watch area (usually amounting to damage consistent with EF4 or EF5 tornadoes at maximum), in addition to including significant wind and hail damage. This enhanced wording in a Tornado Watch is meant to alert the public of the potential for very life-threatening severe weather. While there are no set criteria for a PDS watch to be issued, they are usually issued when the potential exists for a major tornado outbreak. These types of tornado watches represent about 90% of PDS watches issued by the Storm Prediction Center. PDS Tornado Watches are often issued on high risk days for severe weather, though have been issued on high-end moderate risk days.

The PDS tornado watch shown below was issued on November 29, 2022.

PDS tornado warning 
PDS tornado warnings are currently issued on an experimental basis by the 38 National Weather Service Weather Forecast Offices within the Central Region. The criteria for a PDS warning are when a tornado on the ground has been spotted or confirmed, or a significant tornado is expected based on radar signatures. While the intention of this experimental warning may be to replace the loosely defined tornado emergency, PDS tornado warnings are structured as the second highest level of tornado warning within the impact based warning system (an experiment – which also includes tags within warning products illustrating radar indications or physical observations of tornadoes, and damage potential – participated by the 33 Weather Forecast Offices within the Central Region, as well as eight additional offices within the Western, Eastern and Southern regions that began utilizing the system in the spring of 2014); a tornado emergency, the highest warning level, is used within the United States for destructive tornadoes approaching more densely populated areas. These are the first warnings issued with PDS wording, and like PDS flash flood watches, are issued by local forecast offices.

Below is an example of a PDS Tornado Warning from the Sandy Hook, Mississippi EF4 tornado on April 19, 2020.

PDS wind chill warning
PDS wind chill warnings are issued when there is an enhanced risk of frost bite, hypothermia, and eventually death due to extremely low wind chills. These warnings are issued by the National Weather Service Weather Forecast Offices rather than the Storm Prediction Center.

The PDS wind chill warning shown below was issued by the National Weather Service in the Twin Cities on January 5, 2014.

Other watches and warnings 
While the use of PDS wording for other types of watches and warnings has not been used, PDS wording could theoretically be applied to any kind of watch or warning to alert the public to weather events where there exists an increased risk of loss of life or widespread damage to property. Such situations could include PDS watches or warnings for blizzards, ice storms, or extreme heat. For example, on October 29, 2012 in advance of Hurricane Sandy, which was expected to become post-tropical prior to making landfall, a high wind warning was issued for New Jersey stating "This is an extremely dangerous situation!" Similarly, on May 26, 2015 during the flood disaster in Texas, Oklahoma, Arkansas, and Louisiana, a flood warning was issued similar to a PDS flood warning stating "...This is a dangerous and life-threatening situation..." A severe thunderstorm warning bulletin issued by the National Weather Service at Tampa Bay/Ruskin regarding a strong, tornadic storm system moving through the area contained the following: "This storm may cause serious injury and significant property damage."

References

External links 
 NOAA-NWS Storm Prediction Center

Weather warnings and advisories
National Weather Service
1980s neologisms